Perrotia eximia is a butterfly in the family Hesperiidae. It is found in central Madagascar. The habitat consists of forests.

References

Butterflies described in 1923
Erionotini